Nyctemera quaternarium is a moth of the family Erebidae first described by Arnold Pagenstecher in 1900. It is found on the Bismarck Archipelago of Papua New Guinea.

References

Nyctemerina
Moths described in 1900